Liam Meaney (born 1972) is an Irish retired hurler who played as a midfielder for the Cork senior team.

Born in Bishopstown, Meaney first played competitive hurling during his schooling at St Flannan's College. He arrived on the inter-county scene at the age of seventeen when he first linked up with the Cork minor teams as a dual player, before later joining the under-21 sides. He joined the senior panel during the 1992-93 National League. Meaney won one National Hurling League medal as a non-playing substitute.

At club level Meaney is a three-time championship medallist with Blackrock. He also played Gaelic football with St Michael's while he began his career with Bishopstown.

Meaney was later appointed general manager of Cork City F. C.

Honours

Team
St Flannan's college
Dr. Harty Cup (2): 1989, 1990

Bishopstown
Cork Intermediate Hurling Championship (1): 1992

Blackrock
Cork Senior Hurling Championship (3): 1999, 2000, 2001

Cork
National Hurling League (1): 1992-93
Munster Under-21 Hurling Championship (1): 1993
Munster Minor Hurling Championship (1): 1990

References

1972 births
Living people
Bishopstown hurlers
Bishopstown Gaelic footballers
Blackrock National Hurling Club hurlers
St Michael's (Cork) Gaelic footballers
Cork inter-county hurlers
Cork inter-county Gaelic footballers
Dual players